K1010 TV was a short-lived German call-in TV station headquartered in Berlin. K1010 TV, based on the website of the same name, launched in 2004.

K1010 TV differed from most other call-in TV stations. It featured quiz shows where callers could complete rounds which became progressively more difficult, earning more money for every round completed. While the caller could choose to stop after every round, if he lost he would win no money. The various quiz shows were rather challenging, for example, the Newsquiz asked questions on current affairs. These quiz shows were also broadcast on other TV stations, like n-tv.

Due to a very poor distribution in cable TV networks and the subsequent lack of callers, K1010 TV was forced to close in 2006, just two years after its opening. It was replaced by the shopping TV station Gems TV, which later became Juwelo TV.

References

External links

German-language television stations
Television channels and stations established in 2004
Television channels and stations disestablished in 2006
Defunct television channels in Germany
Mass media in Berlin
2004 establishments in Germany
2006 disestablishments in Germany